Beautiful Skin were an American post-punk band extant from 1997 until their 2001 split. Despite never achieving real mainstream or commercial success, they are regarded by some as a trailblazer for the post-punk revival.

History
Beautiful Skin consisted of guitarist Nick Forte and Brazilian keyboardist Ross Totino. Totino had played with many bands in Brazil in the 1980s, playing covers of bands like Wire and The Cure at talent shows and parties, while Forte had been a member of U.S. hardcore band Rorschach. The two met while working at an electronics factory in New York; Forte was at the time playing in the band Computer Cougar, who released a single and a posthumous LP on the label Gern Blandsten.

Soon the pair were experimenting together, combining their respective influences into a sound reminiscent of the post-punk of Wire and The Cure as well as the experimental electronic of Suicide and Orchestral Manoeuvres in the Dark and the krautrock of Can and Kraftwerk. Their debut single, "Sex is a Triangle for the Perfect Square" was followed up by the critically acclaimed Revolve, their debut LP released on Gold Standard Laboratories (GSL). With the addition of Mitch Rackin on bass and Charles Burst on drums, Beautiful Skin toured the west coast in the winter of 2000/2001, supporting labelmates such as The Locust, Le Shok, and De Facto, and split soon after. Various unreleased recordings from the duo and four-piece eras were issued as Everything, All This and More on GSL in 2005. Totino currently lives in Los Angeles, now recording under the name Fans of Collision. Forte also continues to write and record, and produces remixes under various names. Rackin has since played with the bands Dirty Rainbow and Heavy Hands. Burst is a member of The Occasion and also performs with Mike Wexler.

Members
 Nick Forte - Vocals/Guitar (1997–2001)
 Ross Totino - Keyboards (1997–2001)
 Charles Burst - Drums (2000–2001)
 Mitch Rackin - Bass (2000–2001)

Discography

Singles
 "Sex is a Triangle for the Perfect Square/Work Will Set You Free" - 2000

LPs
 Revolve - 2000
 Everything, All This and More - 2005

References

External links
 Beautiful Skin on Myspace
 Gold Standard Laboratories

Musical groups from New York (state)
American post-punk music groups
Musical groups established in 1997